Our Angry Earth: A Ticking Ecological Bomb (1991) is a non-fiction book and polemic against the effects humankind is having on the environment by the science fiction writers Isaac Asimov and Frederik Pohl. 
In his last non-fiction book, Asimov co-writes with his long-time friend science fiction author Frederik Pohl, and deals with elements of the environmental crisis such as overpopulation, oil dependence, war, global warming and the destruction of the ozone layer.

It suggests monumental disasters are threatening to destroy humankind and argues that "it is too late to save our planet from harm". The book has four sections: "The Background", "The Problems", "The Technocures" and "The Way to Go".

It was first published by Tor Books in 1991, . A 2018 edition (after both authors had died) includes a new introduction and afterword by Kim Stanley Robinson.

References

1991 non-fiction books
1991 in the environment
Climate change books
Environmental non-fiction books
Books by Isaac Asimov
Books by Frederik Pohl
Tor Books books